The Western Illinois Valley Conference is a conference of the IHSA located in the west-central part of Illinois.

Current members
A total of 14 school are members.

Beardstown
Carrollton
Concord (Triopia)
Greenfield
Hardin (Calhoun)

Jacksonville (Routt)
Mt. Sterling (Brown County)
Pleasant Hill
White Hall (North Greene)
Winchester
Camp Point Central

Past members
 Bunker Hill
 Meredosia
 New Berlin
 Northwestern
 Ursuline
Illinois School of the Deaf (ISD)
Virginia
Bluffs

Sanctioned sports

Football
For football, the conference is split into North and South divisions. Mendon(Unity) is included in the conference strictly for football.

Volleyball

Boys basketball

Girls basketball

Baseball
Just like football, baseball is also split into North and South divisions.

Softball
Softball is also split into North and South divisions.

Track & field
The conference meet is held near the end of every season at Illinois College.

State finishes

Baseball
Routt 1st (2007-2008 1A)
Carrollton 1st (2010-2011 1A)
Brown County 2nd (2021-2022 1A)

Boys basketball
West Central 2nd (2010-2011 1A)
Carrollton 2nd (2011-2012 1A)
Triopia 4th (2018-2019 1A)

Football
Triopia 2nd (1974-1975 1A)
Triopia 1st (1975-1976 1A)
Triopia 2nd (1976-1977 1A)
Routt 1st (1984-1985 1A)
Calhoun 2nd (1987-1988 1A)
Greenfield 2nd (1991-1992 2A)
Calhoun 1st (1992-1993 1A)
Calhoun 1st (1993-1994 1A)
Triopia 1st (2008-2009 1A)
Carrollton 2nd (2014-2015 1A)
Camp Point 2nd (2018-2019 1A)
Carrollton 2nd (2021-2022 1A)

Girls basketball
Carrollton 2nd (1998-1999 A)
Carrollton 1st (2000-2001 A)
Carrollton 1st (2001-2002 A)
Routt 3rd (2006-2007 A)
Routt 4th (2007-2008 1A)
West Central 2nd (2008-2009 1A)
Routt 2nd (2009-2010 1A)
West Central 1st (2010-2011 1A)
Carrollton 2nd (2013-2014 1A)
Calhoun 2nd (2014-2015 1A)
Calhoun 1st (2015-2016 1A)

Softball
Carrollton 4th (1997-1998 A)
Carrollton 2nd (2001-2002 A)
Calhoun 4th (2010-2011 1A)
Calhoun 1st (2015 1A)
Calhoun 1st (2016 1A)
Calhoun 4th (2018 1A)

Volleyball
A-C Central 2nd (2008-2009 1A)

References

External links 

Illinois high school sports conferences